Cindy Russo (born September 7, 1952) served as the women's basketball head coach at Florida International and Lamar.  Retiring in January 2015, her career spanned 39 years with 38 of those years as a head coach.  She had several accomplishments over her career.  She guided the FIU Panthers to 20 consecutive winning seasons.  Her teams also achieved 20 win seasons 18 times.  Her teams participated in six NCAA Division I women's basketball tournaments, seven WNIT tournaments, and two NCAA Division II Tournaments.

Russo was born in Portsmouth, Virginia and graduated from Old Dominion University in 1975.

Head coaching record

* 2003–04 wins vacated by the NCAA; FIU originally finished 4th in the East Division.
** Partial season.  Coach Russo resigned effective immediately on January 22, 2015.  Interim head coach completed the season. Inge Nissen became interim head coach and went 0–13 (all in C-USA), for the team to finish 3–26 (0–18 C-USA) and in 14th place.

References 

1952 births
Living people
American women's basketball coaches
Basketball coaches from Virginia
Basketball players from Virginia
FIU Panthers women's basketball coaches
Lamar Lady Cardinals basketball coaches
Old Dominion Monarchs women's basketball coaches
Old Dominion Monarchs women's basketball players
Sportspeople from Portsmouth, Virginia